Charles May FRS (4 May 1801, Alton, Hampshire – 10 August 1860) was an English chemist, engineer and astronomer active in the mid nineteenth century.

Charles was born the son of two quakers, Samuel, a draper and Ann May. His brother Francis May was a co founder of the Bryant and May match-making company. He served an apprenticeship with another quaker, Ollive Sims, a chemist in Stockport, after which he set up in business as a chemist and druggist in Ampthill, Bedfordshire. On 24 April 1824 he married Ann Simms, daughter of Ollive Sims.

Royal Society
May was elected as a Fellow of the Royal Society on 6 April 1843, having been proposed by Dr. George Witt of Bedford, Isambard Kingdom Brunel and John Herschel.

Reflist

1801 births
1860 deaths
English Quakers
English engineers
People from Alton, Hampshire
Fellows of the Royal Society